Phú Mỹ Hưng may refer to several places in Ho Chi Minh City, Vietnam, including:

Phú Mỹ Hưng (commune), a rural commune of Củ Chi District
Phú Mỹ Hưng urban area, a new urban area in District 7